Tzukei Yam (lit. Sea Cliffs) is a community settlement in central Israel. Located on the coast of the Mediterranean Sea to the north of Netanya, it falls under the jurisdiction of Hefer Valley Regional Council, of which it is the westernmost community.

History
The village was established in 1956, and was named after the nearby cliffs.

References

Community settlements
Populated places established in 1956
Populated places in Central District (Israel)
1956 establishments in Israel